Zod may refer to:

General Zod, a DC Comics character and enemy of Superman
Zod (Gobots), a villain from Challenge of the GoBots

See also
 Zed (disambiguation)